Dakota Daulby (born October 10, 1994) is a Canadian film and television actor, producer, director and screenwriter.

Early life
Daulby was born in Vancouver, British Columbia. He spends his time between his home town of Maple Ridge and Vancouver. He started his two-year acting program under the department head and Gemini Award winning actor Phil Granger and completed the program with honours in September 2014.

Career
Daulby entered the American market with work on TV shows such as Falling Skies and Wayward Pines. He discovered his love for acting at a young age and proceeded to enroll in New Image College.

2011–2014: Early roles 

Daulby got his first break after landing the lead role in the award-winning short film Why Does God Hate Me?, written and directed by Joel Ashton McCarthy. The film was featured at the New York Film Festival and other film festivals across the world.

Daulby next appeared in the Lifetime film Girl Fight by director Stephen Gyllenhaal. He cited Gyllenhaal's son, Jake Gyllenhaal as a major influence on his career.

The following year, Daulby landed the starring role in the feature film The Woodcarver, alongside John Ratzenberger. He co-starred as the love interest in the Leo Award-winning big screen adaptation Sitting on the Edge of Marlene alongside Paloma Kwiatkowski and Suzanne Clément, adapted from the novella The Trouble With Marlene by Billie Livingston.

2014–present: Falling Skies and beyond 

Daulby appeared in the series Spooksville, CW's iZombie, Pretty Little Addict and in a recurring role on the fourth season of Falling Skies. Daulby portrays the ruthless Nazi-esque head of the Espheni brainwashing camps, Kent Matthews. On the show, he worked closely with Maxim Knight, Noah Wyle, Will Patton, Doug Jones and Colin Cunningham.

In early 2014, Daulby won the leading role in the Canadian horror thriller, Black Fly, which was released at international film festivals in 2015. Daulby received a nomination at Leo Awards for "Best Male Lead in a Motion Picture" - losing to his Black Fly co-star Matthew MacCaull. In November 2015, Daulby was nominated for and won the ACTRA Union of BC Performers (UBCP) award for the best emerging performer for his role in Black Fly.

Daulby co-wrote, co-directed, and co-produced over 20 short and alternative media films with New Image Entertainment. In 2016, he had a guest starring role opposite Academy Award nominatee Djimon Hounsou, in M. Night Shyamalan's Wayward Pines. Daulby played Travis in the Luc Besson fantasy epic, The Warriors Gate.

Other projects 

Daulby was the co-creator of the Vancouver-based 72 horror film festival, The Phrike Filmfest - also acting as the shows official MC. He is highly involved in New Image College's community events, he hosted and appeared on such shows like Breakfast Television, the Fair at the PNE, Electric Playground and Shaw Television.

Daulby appears in the CW's The 100 (TV Series) as Sheidheda.

Filmography

References

1994 births
Living people
Canadian male film actors
Canadian male television actors
Male actors from Vancouver